The Mūlasarvāstivāda (Sanskrit: मूलसर्वास्तिवाद) was one of the early Buddhist schools of India. The origins of the Mūlasarvāstivāda and their relationship to the Sarvāstivāda sect still remain largely unknown, although various theories exist.

The continuity of the Mūlasarvāstivāda monastic order remains in Tibetan Buddhism, although until recently, only Mūlasarvāstivādin bhikṣus (monks) existed: the bhikṣuṇī order had never been introduced.

History

In India
The relationship of the Mūlasarvāstivāda to the Sarvāstivāda school is a matter of dispute; modern scholars lean towards classifying them as independent. Yijing claimed that they derived their name from being an offshoot of Sarvāstivāda, but Buton Rinchen Drub stated that the name was a homage to Sarvāstivāda as the "root" (mūla) of all Buddhist schools. A number of theories have been posited by academics as to how the two are related, which Bhikkhu Sujato summaries as follows:

According to Gregory Schopen, the Mūlasarvāstivāda developed during the 2nd century AD and went into decline in India by the 7th century.

In Central Asia
The Mūlasarvāstivāda were prevalent at times throughout Central Asia due to missionary activities performed in the region. A number of scholars identify three distinct major phases of missionary activities seen in the history of Buddhism in Central Asia, which are associated with the following sects chronologically:

 Dharmaguptaka
 Sarvāstivāda
 Mūlasarvāstivāda

In Śrīvijaya
In the 7th century, Yijing writes that the Mūlasarvāstivāda were prominent throughout the kingdom of Śrīvijaya (modern day Indonesia). Yijing stayed in Śrīvijaya for six to seven years, during which time he studied Sanskrit and translated Sanskrit texts into Chinese. Yijing states that the Mūlasarvāstivāda vinaya was almost universally adopted in this area. He writes that the subjects studied, as well as the rules and ceremonies, were essentially the same in this region as they were in India. Yijing described these islands as generally "Hīnayāna" in orientation, but writes that the Melayu Kingdom included Mahāyāna teachings such as Asaṅga's Yogācārabhūmi Śāstra.

Vinaya lineage
The Mūlasarvāstivāda vinaya is one of three surviving vinaya lineages, along with the Dharmaguptaka and Theravāda. The Tibetan Emperor Ralpacan restricted Buddhist ordination to the Mūlasarvāstivādin vinaya. As Buddhism was introduced to Mongolia from Tibet, Mongolian ordination follows this rule as well.

The Mūlasarvāstivāda Vinaya is extant in Tibetan (9th century translation) and Chinese (8th century translation), and to some extent in the original Sanskrit.

References

Further reading
 Yamagiwa Nobuyuki (2003). "Recent Studies on Vinaya Manuscripts". Journal of Indian and Buddhist studies 52 (1), 339-333 
 Satoshi Hiraoka (1998). "The Relation between the Divyavadana and the Mulasarvastivada Vinaya". Journal of Indian Philosophy 26 (5), 419-434

Early Buddhist schools
Srivijaya
Sarvāstivāda
Vinaya